Tecoluca is a municipality in the San Vicente department of El Salvador. A maximum security prison referred to as the Terrorism Confinement Center is situated in Tecoluca.

References 

Municipalities of the San Vicente Department